Adventures in Foam is the first album by Brazilian electronic musician Amon Tobin, and the only one to be released under the name Cujo (Portuguese for "whose"). It was first released in September 1996 on the small south London label Ninebar records. This was around the same time that Tobin signed with Ninja Tune to record under his own name.

Critical reception
The Stranger, in a retrospective article on Tobin, called the album a "triphop classic."

Peter Shapiro, in Drum 'n' Bass: The Rough Guide, called the album "a further exercise in jazz-based sampladelic quirkiness that was a bit too clever, a bit too blunted and bit too broad-minded to really work."

Track listing

Original Ninebar edition 
The track lists of the original CD and LP versions, as released in the UK on 16 September 1996, were as follows:

US (Shadow Records) edition 

The album was released in the United States, with an altered track listing and artwork unapproved by Tobin, by Shadow Records on 27 May 1997 – after the release of Tobin's first Ninja Tune album, Bricolage.

Ninja Tune reissue 
The Ninja Tune edition adds six tracks to the original Ninebar edition.

References

External links 
 Listen to Adventures in Foam on amontobin.com
 
 Amon Tobin / Cujo Discography (Unofficial but Complete) at pe7er.com

1996 debut albums
Amon Tobin albums
Electronic albums by Brazilian artists
Shadow Records albums